McDonald Island or MacDonald Island may refer to

McDonald Islands, part of Heard Island and McDonald Islands group, a remote territory administered by Australia in the southern Indian Ocean
McDonald Island (California), in San Joaquin County on the San Joaquin River
McDonald Island (Ontario), in the St. Lawrence River
MacDonald Island, in British Columbia
MacDonald Island Park, 2014 arena for The National curling tournament in Fort McMurray, Alberta, Canada